Professor Brainium's Games  is an educational video game by Polish developer Frontline Studios released exclusively for the Nintendo DS in 2008. The purpose of the game is to inform the player by providing various puzzles, which they must complete to progress further. The game is similar to Brain Age and Big Brain Academy in its format and style of play.

Links and References 
Website with info.

See also 
 Brain Age 
Big Brain Academy
Nintendo DS

2008 video games
Brain training video games
Frontline Studios games
Multiplayer and single-player video games
Nintendo DS games
Nintendo DS-only games
North America-exclusive video games
Puzzle video games
Video games developed in Poland